The 2016–17 Texas Tech Red Raiders basketball team represented Texas Tech University in the 2016–17 NCAA Division I men's basketball season. The Red Raiders were led by first-year coach Chris Beard. They played their home games at the United Supermarkets Arena in Lubbock, Texas as members of the Big 12 Conference. They finished the season 18–14, 6–12 in Big 12 play to finish in a tie for seventh place. They lost in the first round of the Big 12 tournament to Texas.

Previous season 
The Red Raiders finished the 2015–16 season 19–13, 9–9 in Big 12 play to finish in seventh place in conference. They lost in the first round of the Big 12 tournament to TCU. They received an at-large bid to the NCAA tournament where they lost in the First Round to Butler.

On April 14, 2016, head coach Tubby Smith left the school to accept the head coaching position at Memphis. The next day, the school hired Chris Beard, the head coach at Little Rock, as head coach.

Offseason

Departures

Incoming transfers

Recruits 
Texas Tech did not have any incoming players in the 2017 recruiting class.

Roster

Schedule

|-
!colspan=12 style=| Exhibition

|-
!colspan=12 style=| Regular season

|-
!colspan=12 style=| Big 12 Tournament

References

External links 
 Official Texas Tech Red Raiders men's basketball page

Texas Tech Red Raiders basketball seasons
Texas Tech
Texas Tech
Texas Tech